Amber van der Heijde is a Dutch football midfielder currently playing in the BeNe League for Telstar. She previously played in the Eredivisie for FC Twente and AZ, with which she played the Champions League. She has been an U-19 international.

References

1988 births
Living people
Dutch women's footballers
People from Purmerend
Eredivisie (women) players
Telstar (women's football club) players
FC Twente (women) players
AZ Alkmaar (women) players
Women's association football midfielders
Footballers from North Holland
20th-century Dutch women
21st-century Dutch women